Piaśnik may refer to the following places:
Piaśnik, Myślibórz County in West Pomeranian Voivodeship (north-west Poland)
Piaśnik, Pyrzyce County in West Pomeranian Voivodeship (north-west Poland)
Piaśnik, Stargard County in West Pomeranian Voivodeship (north-west Poland)